Fatty acid synthase (FAS) is an enzyme that in humans is encoded by the FASN gene.

Fatty acid synthase is a multi-enzyme protein that catalyzes fatty acid synthesis. It is not a single enzyme but a whole enzymatic system composed of two identical 272 kDa multifunctional polypeptides, in which substrates are handed from one functional domain to the next.

Its main function is to catalyze the synthesis of palmitate (C16:0, a long-chain saturated fatty acid) from acetyl-CoA and malonyl-CoA, in the presence of NADPH.

The fatty acids are synthesized by a series of decarboxylative Claisen condensation reactions from acetyl-CoA and malonyl-CoA. Following each round of elongation the beta keto group is reduced to the fully saturated carbon chain by the sequential action of a ketoreductase (KR), dehydratase (DH), and enoyl reductase (ER). The growing fatty acid chain is carried between these active sites while attached covalently to the phosphopantetheine prosthetic group of an acyl carrier protein (ACP), and is released by the action of a thioesterase (TE) upon reaching a carbon chain length of 16 (palmitic acid).

Classes 

There are two principal classes of fatty acid synthases. 
 Type I systems utilise a single large, multifunctional polypeptide and are common to both animals and fungi (although the structural arrangement of fungal and animal syntheses differ). A Type I fatty acid synthase system is also found in the CMN group of bacteria (corynebacteria, mycobacteria, and nocardia). In these bacteria, the FAS I system produces palmitic acid, and cooperates with the FAS II system to produce a greater diversity of lipid products.
 Type II is found in archaea, bacteria and plant plastids, and is characterized by the use of discrete, monofunctional enzymes for fatty acid synthesis. Inhibitors of this pathway (FASII) are being investigated as possible antibiotics.

The mechanism of FAS I and FAS II elongation and reduction is the same, as the domains of the FAS II enzymes are largely homologous to their domain counterparts in FAS I multienzyme polypeptides. However, the differences in the organization of the enzymes - integrated in FAS I, discrete in FAS II - gives rise to many important biochemical differences.

The evolutionary history of fatty acid synthases are very much intertwined with that of polyketide synthases (PKS). Polyketide synthases use a similar mechanism and homologous domains to produce secondary metabolite lipids. Furthermore, polyketide synthases also exhibit a Type I and Type II organization. FAS I in animals is thought to have arisen through modification of PKS I in fungi, whereas FAS I in fungi and the CMN group of bacteria seem to have arisen separately through the fusion of FAS II genes.

Structure 

Mammalian FAS consists of a homodimer of two identical protein subunits, in which three catalytic domains in the N-terminal section (-ketoacyl synthase (KS), malonyl/acetyltransferase (MAT), and dehydrase (DH)), are separated by a core region of 600 residues from four C-terminal domains (enoyl reductase (ER), -ketoacyl reductase (KR), acyl carrier protein (ACP) and thioesterase (TE)).

The conventional model for organization of FAS (see the 'head-to-tail' model on the right) is largely based on the observations that the bifunctional reagent 1,3-dibromopropanone (DBP) is able to crosslink the active site cysteine thiol of the KS domain in one FAS monomer with the phosphopantetheine prosthetic group of the ACP domain in the other monomer. Complementation analysis of FAS dimers carrying different mutations on each monomer has established that the KS and MAT domains can cooperate with the ACP of either monomer. and a reinvestigation of the DBP crosslinking experiments revealed that the KS active site Cys161 thiol could be crosslinked to the ACP 4'-phosphopantetheine thiol of either monomer. In addition, it has been recently reported that a heterodimeric FAS containing only one competent monomer is capable of palmitate synthesis.

The above observations seemed incompatible with the classical 'head-to-tail' model for FAS organization, and an alternative model has been proposed, predicting that the KS and MAT domains of both monomers lie closer to the center of the FAS dimer, where they can access the ACP of either subunit (see figure on the top right).

A low resolution X-ray crystallography structure of both pig (homodimer) and yeast FAS (heterododecamer) along with a ~6 Å resolution electron cryo-microscopy (cryo-EM) yeast FAS structure  have been solved.

Substrate shuttling mechanism 
The solved structures of yeast FAS and mammalian FAS show two distinct organizations of highly conserved catalytic domains/enzymes in this multi-enzyme cellular machine. Yeast FAS has a highly efficient rigid barrel-like structure with 6 reaction chambers which synthesize fatty acids independently, while the mammalian FAS has an open flexible structure with only two reaction chambers. However, in both cases the conserved ACP acts as the mobile domain responsible for shuttling the intermediate fatty acid substrates to various catalytic sites. A first direct structural insight into this substrate shuttling mechanism was obtained by cryo-EM analysis, where ACP is observed bound to the various catalytic domains in the barrel-shaped yeast fatty acid synthase. The cryo-EM results suggest that the binding of ACP to various sites is asymmetric and stochastic, as also indicated by computer-simulation studies

Regulation 

Metabolism and homeostasis of fatty acid synthase is transcriptionally regulated by Upstream Stimulatory Factors (USF1 and USF2) and sterol regulatory element binding protein-1c (SREBP-1c) in response to feeding/insulin in living animals.

Although liver X receptors (LXRs) modulate the expression of sterol regulatory element binding protein-1c (SREBP-1c) in feeding, regulation of FAS by SREBP-1c is USF-dependent.

Acylphloroglucinols isolated from the fern Dryopteris crassirhizoma show a fatty acid synthase inhibitory activity.

Clinical significance 

The gene that codes for FAS has been investigated as a possible oncogene. FAS is upregulated in breast and gastric cancers, as well as being an indicator of poor prognosis, and so may be worthwhile as a chemotherapeutic target. FAS inhibitors are therefore an active area of drug discovery research.

FAS may also be involved in the production of an endogenous ligand for the nuclear receptor PPARalpha, the target of the fibrate drugs for hyperlipidemia, and is being investigated as a possible drug target for treating the metabolic syndrome. Orlistat which is a gastrointestinal lipase inhibitor also inhibits FAS and has a potential as a medicine for cancer.

In some cancer cell lines, this protein has been found to be fused with estrogen receptor alpha (ER-alpha), in which the N-terminus of FAS is fused in-frame with the C-terminus of ER-alpha.

An association with uterine leiomyomata has been reported.

See also
 Discovery and development of gastrointestinal lipase inhibitors
 Fatty acid synthesis
 Fatty acid metabolism
 Fatty acid degradation
 Enoyl-acyl carrier protein reductase
 List of fatty acid metabolism disorders

References

Further reading

External links

 
 Fatty Acid Synthesis: Rensselaer Polytechnic Institute
 Fatty Acid Synthase: RCSB PDB Molecule of the Month  
 3D electron microscopy structures of fatty acid synthase from the EM Data Bank(EMDB)
 PDBe-KB provides an overview of all the structure information available in the PDB for Human Fatty acid synthase

Transferases
EC 2.3.1
Metabolism
Fatty acids
NADPH-dependent enzymes
Enzymes of known structure